Jesús Manuel Nieves Cortés (born April 9, 1993), known professionally as Jhayco (formerly Jhay Cortez), is a Puerto Rican rapper and singer from Río Piedras, San Juan. After releasing multiple EPs, his debut studio album, Famouz, was released in 2019.

Biography 
Cortez was born in Río Piedras, Puerto Rico. Later, he moved to live in Camden New Jersey. As a result, Cortez had a bilingual childhood.

He began composing songs at age 15, this made producer Eddie Dee interested in him and he was known by producers Lele el Arma Secreta and Eliel, with whom he began to write songs and who connect him to work with him. duo Zion & Lennox, for which he composed two songs, "Como curar" and "Detective de tu amor", in addition to producing "Soltera" under the pseudonym Jay el Superdotado, the three songs forming part of the album Los Verdaderos.

Later he composed five singles for Tito El Bambino, among them: "Llama al sol" for his album Invencible published in 2011, which would be the winner of a Latin Grammy in the category of best tropical album.

Musical career

2013–2016: Beginnings and productions 
In 2013, he began as a singer as part of a Latin pop group called Stereo 4, which was born as an idea of Joel Báez who takes on the task with Roberto Sánchez and his inseparable working duo, Jhay Nieves (vocalist of the group), to find those who would soon be part of this musical group. Stereo 4 was the mix of four totally different voices. The youth group was made up of four young Puerto Ricans: Jafet Cortes, Eduardo Esteras, Rubén Chinea and Jesús M. Nieves. Some time later, Cortez launched himself as a soloist. He collaborated with the group for the last time in 2016 with the song "Te quiero ver", which was a collaboration with his former group and with which he debuted as a soloist.

2017–2019: Signing to Universal Music Latino and Famouz 
On August 22, 2017, Cortez signed a contract with the Universal Music Latino discography under the House of Haze movement in alliance with the producer Fino como el Haze, with which he released his first single under this label, "Donde no se vea", with the collaborations of Jory Boy and Pusho.

On March 16, 2018, Cortez performed at a concert that benefited victims of natural disasters with the name of SXSW as one of the artists of the Port Relief Showcase. Later he helped in the composition of the songs "Criminal" by Natti Natasha with Ozuna and "Mi Religión" by Yandel. On May 16 he released the EP Eyez on Me under the Universal Music Latino record label. At the end of 2018 he released his single "Costear" with Almighty, which led to the release of two remixes.

On February 22, 2019, he released his single "No Me Conoce" which reached the top of several Latin American music charts. It was certified triple platinum by PROMUSICAE of Spain; the song also featured a remix with J Balvin and Bad Bunny, and was certified 20 platinum by the US RIAA. In that same year, he also released the song "Deseame suerte" with the collaboration of Karol G. On May 24, he released his first studio album, Famouz, under the Universal Music Latino label. It was ranked 164 on the US Billboard 200 chart, and was certified triple platinum by the RIAA.

2020–present: Timelezz 
At the beginning of 2020 Cortez published a special edition of his first studio album with unreleased songs under the name Famouz Reloaded, and released a new single "Dime a ve", which would be part of his second album, Timelezz. He was also the winner of five ASCAP awards as composer and two Tú Música Urbano Awards in the category of composer of the year and New Generation Album by Famouz. He received nominations for the Billboard Awards of Latin music, Premios Juventud, Lo Nuestro Awards and the Latin Grammys. On October 30 he released the song "Dakiti" in collaboration with Bad Bunny which reached number one on the Billboard Global 200 charts; it also reached the top 10 of the Billboard Hot 100, reaching number 9. At the end of that year, he collaborated on the remix "La Curiosidad" by Jay Wheeler and Myke Towers. It also appeared on Yandel's album Quien Contra Mí 2 in the collaboration of the song "Ponme al día".

At the beginning of 2021 Cortez participated in a production of Los Legendarios with the song "Fiel" with Wisin, which reached number 9 globally on the Spotify music platform. On March 14 he appeared with Bad Bunny performing "Dakiti" at the Grammy Awards ceremony. He also received another IHeartRadio Music Awards nomination in the iHeartRadio Music Award for Latin Pop / Reggaeton Song of the Year category for "Dakiti".

Personal life 
In 2021 Cortez began a relationship with Mia Khalifa.

Controversies 
On May 12, 2020, Cortez released a topic called "24 horas", a diss track for fellow rapper Bryant Myers after both had a strong argument through Twitter, which tried to offend and challenged Myers to respond to him in less than 24 hours. After three days Myers replied with the subject "El que no escribe". However, he confessed that he did not publish it in less than 24 hours because no one tells him what to do, in a direct video from Instagram. This would become the first strip that Myers put out, since on similar occasions with other artists, he had not decided to respond. Shortly after, Cortez published another diss track against him called "Game Over", which Myers did not want to answer as he did not consider it good enough. Some time later, Cortez acknowledged in an interview that the two were disrespectful and said he could make amends in the future when time has passed and they had matured. A year after, he released a diss track on fellow artist Rauw Alejandro titled "Enterrauw".

Discography

Studio albums

EPs

Singles

As lead artist

As featured artist

Other charted and certified songs

Notes

References

External links 
 
 
 

1993 births
Living people
People from Río Piedras, Puerto Rico
Puerto Rican hip hop musicians
Puerto Rican rappers
Puerto Rican reggaeton musicians
Spanish-language singers of the United States
Latin trap musicians
Universal Music Latino artists
Latin music songwriters
Machete Music artists